Seabury School is an independent school for gifted children in Tacoma, Washington.

Founded in 1989, Seabury is the only independent school in the South Puget Sound marketed towards intellectually advanced children. Seabury is a member of the Pacific Northwest Association of Independent Schools (PNAIS) and the Northwest Association of Schools and Colleges (NASC).

Seabury serves students from pre-kindergarten through eighth grades on two campuses: pre-k to fifth in Northeast Tacoma (Browns Point), and six to eighth in downtown Tacoma.

History
The school began when two principals, one in private education and the other retired from public school administration, met and were reflecting on their careers. Barbara Field and Lee Woodworth Fisher were concerned with the lack of appropriate educational placement for very bright, highly exceptional students. At that time, funds for these students were not generally available in the public schools under the assumption these students could "fend for themselves."

In 1988, Field and Fisher met with educators from private gifted schools to learn about the structure, curriculum, and Washington state's legal requirements for private schools. The two founders then met with psychologists, educators from the University of Washington and other public and private programs, in addition to state officials from the Office of Superintendent of Public Instruction. By late fall, it was decided that the school would open with grades kindergarten through second and with plans for inclusion through grade six. After accumulating used furniture, materials and books, Field and Fisher rented a commercially zoned building on 51st Street NE near Commencement Bay in Northeast Tacoma.

The school's name reflected the location's scenic environment and Field's past connections with Episcopal schools.

The  incorporation of the non-profit organization was certified in November 1988. Barbara Field was named as the registered agent. Lee Woodworth Fisher, Lyle Starkey, and Don Field were named incorporators. Evergreen Bank, a teachers' bank in Seattle, provided a $10,000 loan to support the opening of the school, and The Medina Foundation and private donors supplied funds for the school’s initial operation.

In September 1989, Seabury School opened with eighteen students, two teachers and parent volunteer aides. Mrs. Field donated her first year of teaching and administration. Wenda Collins was the upper primary grade teacher. Fisher started the school library with used books and 20 years of National Geographic magazines. The founding Board of Directors included Fisher, financial and legal professionals Ed Opstad (board president) and Scott Jablon, educators Manvel Schauffler and Mary Helen Robinson, and child psychologist Richard Borton.

By September 1990, Seabury had 38 students, a director, three teachers, three aides, a set of bylaws and an ever-expanding set of policies. In 1992, the school was accepted as a candidate member of the Pacific Northwest Association of Independent Schools.

In the fall of 1993, enrollment had expanded so Seabury offered a full academic program of classes for students in preschool through grade six, including French language instruction. In 2009, Seabury continued fulfilling its vision of establishing academic schools for students by opening a middle school for gifted students in grades 6-8 within the heart of downtown Tacoma. Seabury buses its students between the sites.

Lower School
Seabury's Lower School is located in its original location in Northeast Tacoma, and houses pre-kindergarten through fifth grades. The campus has expanded to include administrative offices, a Media Center and library and expanded outdoor play space.

In fall 2010, the Early Learning Center at Seabury School changed from a preschool and kindergarten program to a 4-year-old pre-kindergarten and kindergarten program.

Middle school

Seabury's Middle School opened in September 2009, and is located in Tacoma's downtown Theatre District. The middle school houses sixth, seventh and eighth grades.

The Seabury Middle School program features an integrated curriculum and is designed so that students make the city their classroom. Students take physical education classes at the downtown Tacoma YMCA, do research at the Tacoma Public Library, visit the Tacoma Farmers Market and eat lunch at local delis and cafés.

The school is housed in the Pythian Temple downtown.

Summer@Seabury
Seabury School hosts a series of week-long summer camps each summer at the Lower School campus. Past camps have included Harry Potter, Spy Camp, Geology Camp, The Science and Mosaic Magic. The camps are open to both Seabury students and members of the community from kindergarten through eighth grade. Camps for summer 2020 feature Backyard Habitat; Grossology; Genius Camp; Renaissance; Earth Stewards; Space; Pangolins, Narwhals & Unicorns; the Deep, Dark Sea, and Junior Counselor. Registration opens March 31, 2020.

Seabury also hosts workshops and activities for kids throughout the year (Fall@Seabury, Winter@Seabury and Spring@Seabury). Spring@Seabury 2020 features three Spring Break (April 6–9)  activities open to first through eighth graders throughout the community: Miniature Scene Building and Art Meets Math in Grit City for fifth through eighth graders; and Physics is Fhun Lab Camp for first through fifth graders. Registration opens Feb. 12, 2020.

summercamps #springbreak

References

External links
 Seabury School Website
 Seabury Middle School Website
 MySeabury
 "Book Smarts to Street Smarts" article in Tacoma Weekly

Schools in Tacoma, Washington
Private elementary schools in Washington (state)
Private middle schools in Washington (state)
Educational institutions established in 1989
1989 establishments in Washington (state)